Penthe is a genus of polypore fungus beetles in the family Tetratomidae. There are at least three described species in Penthe. Holarctic and Oriental. They live under bark in woody areas.

Species
These species belong to the genus Penthe:
 Penthe almorensis
 Penthe brevicollis
 Penthe japana
 Penthe javana
 Penthe obliquata (Fabricius, 1801)
 Penthe pimelia (Fabricius, 1801) (velvety bark beetle)
 Penthe reitteri Nikitsky, 1998
 Penthe rufopubens
 Penthe similis

References

Further reading

External links

 

Tenebrionoidea
Articles created by Qbugbot